Sphecomyia tsherepanovi is a species of syrphid fly in the family Syrphidae.

Distribution
Russia.

References

Eristalinae
Insects described in 1974
Diptera of Asia